Many places throughout the United States of America take their names from the languages of the indigenous Native American/American Indian tribes. The following list includes settlements, geographic features, and political subdivisions whose names are derived from these languages.

State names

 Alabama – named for the Alibamu, a tribe whose name derives from a Choctaw phrase meaning "thicket-clearers" or "plant-cutters" (from albah, "(medicinal) plants", and amo, "to clear").
 Alaska – from the Aleut phrase alaxsxaq, meaning "the object towards which the action of the sea is directed").
 Arizona – disputed origin; likely from the O'odham phrase ali ṣona-g, meaning "having a little spring".
 Arkansas – from the Illinois rendering of the tribal autonym kką:ze (see Kansas, below), which the Miami and Illinois used to refer to the Quapaw.
 Connecticut – from some Eastern Algonquian language of southern New England (perhaps Mahican), meaning "at the long tidal river" (after the Connecticut River).
 Idaho – may be from Plains Apache ídaahę́, "enemy", used to refer to the Comanches, or it may have been an invented word.
 Illinois – from the French rendering of an Algonquian (perhaps Miami) word apparently meaning "s/he speaks normally" (c.f. Miami ilenweewa), from Proto-Algonquian *elen-, "ordinary" + -wē, "to speak", referring to the Illiniwek.
 Iowa – from Dakota ayúxba or ayuxwe, via French Aiouez.
 Kansas – from the autonym kką:ze.
 Kentucky – from an Iroquoian word meaning "at the meadow" or "on the prairie" (c.f. Seneca gëdá’geh , "at the field").
 Massachusetts – from an Algonquian language of southern New England, and apparently means "near the small big mountain", usually identified as Great Blue Hill on the border of Milton and Canton, Massachusetts (c.f. the Narragansett name Massachusêuck).
 Michigan – from the Ottawa phrase mishigami, meaning "large water" or "large lake".".
 Minnesota – from the Dakota phrase mni-sota, meaning "turbid water".
 Mississippi – from an Algonquian language, probably Ojibwe, meaning "big river" (Ojibwe misiziibi).
 Missouri – named for the Missouri tribe, whose name comes from Illinois mihsoori, "dugout canoe".
 Nebraska – from the Chiwere phrase ñįbraske, meaning "flattened water".
 New Mexico – the name "Mexico" comes from Nahuatl Mēxihco, of unknown derivation.
 North Dakota and South Dakota – dakhóta comes from the Sioux word for "friend" or "ally".
 Ohio – from Seneca ohi:yo’, "beautiful river".
 Oklahoma – invented by Chief Allen Wright as a rough translation of "Indian Territory"; in Choctaw, okla means "people", "tribe", or "nation", and homa- means "red", thus: "Red people".
Tennessee – derived from the name of a Cherokee village, Tanasi, whose etymology is unknown.
 Texas – from the Caddo phrase táyshaʔ, meaning "friend".
 Utah – from a language of one of the Ute tribe's neighbors, such as Western Apache yúdah, "high up".
 Wisconsin – originally "Mescousing", from an Algonquian language, though the source and meaning is not entirely clear; most likely from the Miami word Meskonsing meaning "it lies red" (c.f. Ojibwe miskosin).
 Wyoming – from the Munsee Delaware phrase xwé:wamənk, meaning "at the big river flat".

Alabama

Alaska

Arizona

Arkansas

California

Colorado

Connecticut

Delaware

Settlements

 Appoquinimink Hundred
 Hockessin
 Minquadale
 Naamans Gardens – named after a Minqua chief who befriended the settlers of New Sweden.
 Naamans Creek
 Wawaset Park
 Wyoming – from the Munsee Delaware phrase xwé:wamənk, meaning "at the big river flat".

District of Columbia

Settlements
 Anacostia – from the Piscataway name Anakwashtank, meaning 'a place of traders'. Originally the name of a village of the Piscataway tribe on the Anacostia River. Also rendered as Nacochtank or Nacostine.
 Takoma – originally the name of Mount Rainier, from Lushootseed  (earlier ), 'snow-covered mountain'. The location on the boundary of DC and Maryland was named Takoma in 1883 by DC resident Ida Summy, who believed it to mean 'high up' or 'near heaven'.

Bodies of water
 Potomac River – from the Piscataway language or from a northern dialect of Virginia Algonquian, original form patawomek, meaning 'they bring it' (for trading).

Florida

Counties

 Alachua County and Alachua – from the Timucuan chua, meaning sinkhole.
 Escambia County
 Manatee County – from Taíno manatí  meaning "breast".
 Okaloosa County – from the Choctaw words oka (water) and lusa (black).
 Okeechobee County – from the Hitchiti words oki (water) and chobi (big), a reference to Lake Okeechobee, the largest lake in Florida.
 Osceola County – named after Osceola, the Native American leader who led the Second Seminole War.
 Sarasota County
 Seminole County – named after the Seminole Native American tribe.
 Suwannee County – from Timucua "suwani" meaning "echo river".
 Suwannee River
 Volusia County
 Wakulla County

Settlements

 Abacoa – Originally the name of a village of the Jaega tribe.
 Alafaya – After the Alafay people, a sub-group of the Pohoy
 Apalachicola – from Choctaw Apalachee + oklah, "people". Name of the Apalachicola Province.
 Apopka – from probably Seminole Aha, meaning "Potato," and papka, meaning "eating place".
 Hialeah – From Muscogee meaning "pretty prairie".
 Immokalee – from Choctaw(?) im-okli, "his/her home".
 Kissimmee – Disputed meaning, perhaps derived from Ais word "Cacema" meaning "long water".
 Miami – Native American name for Lake Okeechobee and the Miami River, precise origin debated; see also Mayaimi
 Micanopy – named after Seminole chief Micanopy.
 Myakka City – from unidentified Native American language.
 Ocala – from Timucua meaning "Big Hammock".
 Pensacola – from the Choctaw name of a Muskogean group, "hair people", from pashi, "hair" + oklah, "people".
 Steinhatchee – from the Muscogee "hatchee" meaning creek
 Tallahassee – from the name of a Creek town, talahá:ssi, perhaps from (i)tálwa, "tribal town" + ahá:ssi, "old, rancid".
 Tampa – probably from the name of a Calusa village, with no further known etymology.
 Tequesta – named for the Tequesta tribe.
 Thonotosassa – from the Seminole-Creek words thlonto and sasse, meaning the place was a source of valuable flint.
 Wekiva Springs – from Creek word for "spring".

Bodies of water
 Caloosahatchee River – from Calusa  + hatchee, Choctaw for river.
 Loxahatchee River – from Seminole for river of turtles.
 Withlacoochee River – from Creek we (water), thlako (big), and chee (little), or little big water.

Other
 Paynes Prairie – named after leading chief of the Seminoles King Payne.

Georgia

Counties

 Catoosa County
 Chattahoochee County
 Chattahoochee River – a major tributary of the Apalachicola River that makes up the southern half of the Alabama-Georgia border
 Chattooga County
 Cherokee County – named after the Cherokee people.
 Coweta County
 Muscogee County
 Oconee County
 Seminole County

Settlements
 Cataula – a small community on US 27 in Harris County where 20th century guitar virtuoso Chet Adkins was born
 Dahlonega
 Nankipooh – once a whistle stop on the Central of Georgia railroads "R" branch, it is now a suburb of Columbus
 Ochillie – a creek that flows northwest through Chattahoochee county, within the boundaries of the Fort Benning military reservation, and into Upatoi creek
 Schatulga – a small community in western Columbus/Muscogee County
 Toccoa
 Upatoi – a creek that runs between Muscogee and Chattahoochee counties in west-central Georgia
 Weracoba – a creek and city park in Columbus

Hawaii

Counties

 Hawaii County
 Honolulu County
 Kalawao County
 Kauai County
 Maui County

Idaho

Counties

 Benewah County
 Caribou County
 Caribou Mountain
 Caribou Mountains
 Caribou–Targhee National Forest
 Kootenai County
 Kootenai River
 Latah County
 Latah Creek
 Minidoka County
 Oneida County
 Owyhee County
 Owyhee Mountains
 Owyhee River
 North Fork Owyhee River
 Middle Fork Owyhee River
 South Fork Owyhee River
 Little Owyhee River
 Shoshone County
 City of Shoshone
 Shoshone John Peak
 Shoshone Falls

Settlements

 Ahsahka
 Chatcolet
 Cocolalla
 Genesee
 Inkom
 Kamiah
 Kuna
 Lapwai
 Lapwai Creek
 Minidoka
 Nampa
 Picabo
 Pocatello
 Potlatch
 Potlatch River
 Tyhee
 Weippe
 Weippe Prairie

Bodies of water

 Hoodoo Lake
 Lochsa River
 Pahsimeroi River
 Secesh River
 Spokane River
 Chief Eagle Eye Creek
 Tolo Lake
 Toxaway Lake
 Yuba River

Other
 Moolack Mountain
 Mount Iowa
 Sacajawea Peaks

Illinois

Indiana

Counties
 Miami County – named for the Miami.
 Tippecanoe County – name comes from a Miami-Illinois word for buffalo fish, reconstructed as */kiteepihkwana/.
 Tippecanoe River
 Wabash County

Settlements

 Mishawaka – named after Shawnee Princess Mishawaka 
 Shipshewana – named after Potawatomi Chief Shipshewana 
 Wanatah – named after the Potawatomi Chief Wanatah, meaning ‘Knee Deep in Mud’, "He who Charges His Enemies" or "The Charger"
 Wapahani High School – Wapahani is a Delaware Indian word for "White River"
 Winamac – town name from the Potawatomi word for "catfish"

Bodies of water
 Lake Wawasee – named for Miami chief Wawasee (Wau-wuh-see), brother of Miami chief  Papakeecha, which translated means "Flat Belly"
 Mississinewa River – partly derived from the Miami Indian word namahchissinwi which means "falling waters" or "much fall in the water".
 Salamonie River – derived from the Miami Indian word osahmonee which means "yellow paint". The Indians would make yellow paint from the bloodroot plant that grew along the river banks.
 Wabash River – French traders named the river after the Miami Indian word for the river, waapaahšiiki, meaning "it shines white", "pure white", or "water over white stones"

Iowa

Kansas

Counties

 Chautauqua County
 Cherokee County – named after the Cherokee people.
 Cheyenne County – named after the Cheyenne people.
 Comanche County – named after the Comanche people.
 Kiowa County
 Miami County – named after the Miami people.
 Nemaha County
 Neosho County
 Osage County – named after the Osage people.
 Osage City
 Ottawa County – named after the Odawa people.
 City of Ottawa
 Pawnee County – named after the Pawnee people.
 Pottawatomie County – named after the Potawatomi people.
 Shawnee County – named after the Shawnee people.
 City of Shawnee 
 Wabaunsee County
 Wichita County – disputed; from Choctaw, "Big Arbor".Osage, "Scattered Lodges". Kiowa, "Tattooed Faces". Creek, "Barking Water".
 City of Wichita
 Wyandotte County – named after the Wyandotte people.

Settlements

 Osawatomie – a compound of two primary Native American Indian tribes from the area, the Osage and Pottawatomie
 Tonganoxie – derives its name from a member of the Delaware tribe that once occupied land in what is now Leavenworth County and western Wyandotte County
 Topeka – from Kansa dóppikʔe, "a good place to dig wild potatoes"

Kentucky

Settlements
 Kuttawa
 Paducah

Other
 Cherokee Park – named after the Cherokee people.
 Iroquois Park – The Iroquois Tribe is a federally recognized Native American tribe.
 Shawnee Park – The Shawnee Tribe is a federally recognized Native American tribe.

Louisiana

Parishes

 Avoyelles Parish – for the Avoyel people
 Caddo Parish – for the Caddo Native Americans
 Calcasieu Parish – means 'crying eagle,' the name of an Atakapa leader
 Catahoula Parish – from a Taensa word meaning 'big, clear lake'
 Catahoula Lake 
 Natchitoches Parish – after the Natchitoches people.
 Natchitoches
 Ouachita Parish – for the Ouachita River
 Plaquemines Parish – based on the Atakapa word for persimmon, as the early French colonists found persimmon trees growing in the lands near the mouth of the Mississippi River.
 Plaquemine – town in Iberville Parish, in the vicinity of Bayou Plaquemine Brulé (see above) 
 Bayou Plaquemine Brule – translating as 'burnt persimmon bayou'
 Saint Tammany Parish – for the legendary Native American chief Tamanend
 Tangipahoa Parish – for the Tangipahoa River
 Tangipahoa, Louisiana – a present-day village in Tangipahoa Parish (see below)
 Tangipahoa River – for the Tangipahoa tribe, closely related to the Acolapissa people; the name is said to refer to those who grind corn.
 Tensas Parish – for the Taensa people

Settlements

 Houma – for the Houma people; seat of Terrebonne Parish
 Natchez, Louisiana – present-day village in Natchitoches Parish; after the Natchez people 
 Opelousas – for the native Appalousa people who formerly occupied the area
 Ponchatoula is a name signifying "falling hair" or "hanging hair" or "flowing hair" from the Choctaw Pashi "hair" and itula or itola "to fall" or "to hang" or "flowing". The Choctaw name Ponchatoula means "flowing hair", arrived at by the Choctaw as a way of expressing the beauty of the location with much moss hanging from the trees. "Ponche" is a Choctaw word meaning location, an object, or a person . See the eponymous Ponchatoula Creek.
 Tickfaw, Louisiana – a present-day village in Tangipahoa Parish (see Tickfaw River)
 Tickfaw River – appears to have the same linguistic roots as Tangipahoa River.
 Tunica – a community in West Feliciana Parish, for the Tunica people
 Tunica Hills – a forest region and wildlife management area, also for the Tunica people

Bodies of water

 Atchafalaya River – from Choctaw words meaning 'long river' (similar to Bogue Falaya's meaning, below); a distributary of the Red River and Mississippi River 
 Atchafalaya Swamp – the largest wetland area in the United States
 Bogue Falaya – tributary of the Tchefuncte River, from the Choctaw words for 'long' and 'river'
 Mississippi River – from the Ojibwe name for the waterway, 'Great River'
 Tchefuncte River – for the historic Tchefuncte culture

Maine

Maryland

Massachusetts

Michigan

Minnesota

Mississippi

Missouri

Counties

 Mississippi County
 Moniteau County
 Nodaway County
 Osage County
 City of Osage Beach
 Pemiscot County
 Texas County

Settlements

 Chilhowee
 Chillicothe
 Koshkonong
 Lake Tapawingo
 Lake Winnebago
 Meramec River
 Miami
 Neosho
 Niangua
 Niangua River
 Lake Niangua
 Osceola
 Saginaw
 Sarcoxie
 Seneca
 Shawnee Mac Lakes
 Tallapoosa
 Tecumseh
 Wasola

Others
 Ha Ha Tonka State Park

Montana

Counties
 Missoula County
 City of Missoula
 Village of East Missoula

Settlements

 Absarokee
 Agawam
 Bannack
 Camas
 Charlo
 Village of Charlo's Heights
 Chinook
 Comanche, named for the Comanche people of the southern plains
 Ekalaka
 Hoosac
 Kalispell, Salish word meaning "flat land above the lake"
 Lima
 Moccasin
 Nashua
 New Miami Colony
 Niarada
 Oswego
 Potomac
 Quebec
 Saco
 Saltese
 Saugus
 Shawmut
 Spokane Creek
 Tampico
 Tarkio
 Turah
 Washoe
 Wyola
 Yaak – from a Kootenay word meaning ‘arrow’.
 Yaak River

Bodies of water

 Arapooish Pond
 Cherokee Reservoir – named after the Cherokee people.
 Cheyenne Reservoir
 Kootenai River
 Kootenai National Forest
 Missouri River
 Little Missouri River
 Navaho Reservoir
 Navajo Tarn
 North Chinook Reservoir
 Sacagawea River
 Shambow Pond
 Shonkin Lake
 Shonkin Sag
 Shupak Ponds
 Sioux Reservoir
 Slag-a-melt Lakes
 Tahepia Lake
 Tepee Butte Reservoir
 Tepee Butte
 Tobacco River
 Ute Reservoir
 Waukena Lake
 Wichiup Reservoir
 Wigwam River

Other
 Absaroka–Beartooth Wilderness
 Absaroka Range

Nebraska

Counties

 Cheyenne County - named after the Cheyenne people.
 Dakota County - named after the Dakota people.
 Key Paha County - Means "turtle hill", is descriptive of the small hills in its vicinity.
 Nemaha County
 Otoe County
 Pawnee County - named after the Pawnee people.
 Sioux County - named after the Sioux people.

Settlements

 Anoka - A Dakota Indian word meaning "on both sides."
 Arapahoe
 Hyannis - Named after Hyannis, Massachusetts, which was named after Iyannough, a sachem of the Cummaquid tribe.
 Iowa
 Kenesaw
 Leshara - Named after Chief Petalesharo.
 Mankato - Mankota is from the Dakota Indian word Maḳaṭo, meaning "blue earth". Named for Mankato, Minnesota.
 Minatare - From the Hidatsa word mirita'ri, meaning "crosses the water."
 Monowi - Meaning "flower", this town was so named because there were so many wild flowers growing in the vicinity.
 Nehawka - An approximation to the Omaha and Otoe Indian name of a nearby creek meaning "rustling water."
 Nemaha -  Named after the Nemaha River, based on an Otoe word meaning "swampy water."
 Niobrara - The Omaha and Ponca word for spreading water or spreading river.
 Oconee - Named for Oconee, Illinois. Oconee was the name of a Creek town.
 Oconto - A Menominee word meaning the "place of the pickerel." Named for Oconto, Wisconsin.
 Ogallala - named for the Oglala people.
 Omaha - Named for the Omaha people who lived nearby
 Oneida – named after the Oneida people.
 Osceola
 Leshara. Named after Petalesharo, a Pawnee chief.
 Pohocco - A precinct in the northeastern part of Saunders county, the name derives from Pahuk, meaning headland or promontory, the Pawnee name of a prominent hill in the vicinity.
 Ponca
 Quinnebaugh
 Santee
 Sappa
 Saratoga
 Tecumseh
 Tekamah - Located on the site of a historic Pawnee village, the surrounding hills were used for burying grounds and the highest point was used as a fire signal station. The origin of the name is not definitely known. 
 Unidilla - An Iroquois word meaning "place of meeting." Named after Unadilla, New York.
 Venango - An eastern Native American name in reference to a figure found on a tree, carved by the Erie.
 Waco - Named after Waco, Texas, which is the name of one of the divisions of the Tawokoni whose village stood on the site of Waco, Texas.
 Wahoo
 Winnebago
 Wyoming - Derived from a corrupted Delaware word meaning "large plains" or "extensive meadows."
 Wyoming Township, Holt County, Nebraska
 Yutan - Named for an Otoe chief.

Nevada

Counties
 Elko County
 City of Elko
 Elko Hills
 Washoe County
 Washoe City
 New Washoe City
 Washoe Valley

Settlements

 Cal-Nev-Ari
 Hiko
 Mesquite
 Moapa
 Moapa Valley
 Owyhee
 Pahrump
 Panaca – derived from the Southern Paiute word Pan-nuk-ker, which means metal, money, and wealth.
 Tonopah
 Winnemucca

Bodies of water

 Lake Lahontan
 Lahontan Dam
 Lake Tahoe
 Lake Tahoe Dam
 Tahoe Vista
 Tallac Creek
 Mount Tallac
 Truckee River
 Upper Truckee River
 Weepah Spring Wilderness

Other

 Cucomungo Mountains
 Desatoya Mountains
 Desatoya Peak
 Goshute Mountains
 Ivanpah Valley
 Kamma Mountains
 Kawich Range
 Tamarack Peak
 Toano Range
 East Pahranagat Range

New Hampshire

 Ammonoosuc River (Upper and Lower): (Abnaki) "small, narrow fishing place"
 Amoskeag: (Pennacook) "fishing place" Manchester
 Ashuelot River (and pond): (Pennacook or Natick) "place between"
 Canobie Lake: (Abnaki) "abundant water"
 Contoocook (and river and lake): (Pennacook) "place of the river near pines" or (Abnaki) "nut trees river" or (Natick) "small plantation at the river"
 Coös: (Pennacook) "pine tree"
 Hooksett: (Pennacook) possible abbreviation of Annahooksett "place of beautiful trees"
 Mascoma River (and lake): (Abnaki) "much grass" or "salmon fishing" or "red rocks"
 Massabesic Lake: (Abnaki) "near the great brook"
 Merrimack River (and town)
 Mount Monadnock: (Natick) "at the most prominent island" (-like mountain)
 Mount Moosilauke: (Abnaki) "good moose place" or "at the smooth place"
 Nashua River (and city): (Pennacook/Nipmuck) "between streams"
 Ossipee River (and town and lake): (Abnaki) "beyond the water"
 Paugus Bay: (Abnaki) "small pond"
 Pawtuckaway Lake (and mountains): (Abnaki) "falls in the river" or "clear, shallow river"
 Pemigewasset River: (Abnaki) "extensive rapids"
 Pennacook (village): tribal name; "at the foothills" 
 Piscataqua River (Maine border): (Pennacook) "place where the river divides"
 Piscataquog River: (Abnaki) "place where the river divides"
 Souhegan River: (Pennacook or Nipmuck) "watching place"
 Squam Lake (and river): (Abnaki) "salmon"
 Lake Sunapee (and town): (Pennacook) "rocks in the water", "rocky pond"
 Suncook River (also lakes and village): (Pennacook) "rocky place"
 Umbagog Lake: (Abnaki) "clear lake"
 Lake Winnipesaukee (and river): (Pennacook) "land around the lakes" or "good land around lake at mountains"
 Lake Winnisquam: (Abnaki) "salmon-fishing place"

New Jersey

New Mexico
 Jemez Springs – named for the nearby Pueblo of Jemez
 Nambe – Tewa: Nambe Owingeh [nɑ̃̀ŋbèʔ ʔówîŋgè]; Nambé is the Spanish version of a similar-sounding Tewa word, which can be interpreted loosely as meaning "rounded earth."
 Pojoaque – Tewa: P'osuwaege Owingeh [p’òhsũ̀wæ̃̀gè ʔówîŋgè]
 Taos – The English name Taos derives from the native Taos language meaning "place of red willows"
 Tesuque – Tewa: Tetsuge Owingeh [tèʔts’úgé ʔówîŋgè])
 Tucumcari – from Tucumcari Mountain, which is situated nearby. Where the mountain got its name is uncertain. It may have come from the Comanche word tʉkamʉkarʉ, which means 'ambush'. A 1777 burial record mentions a Comanche woman and her child captured in a battle at Cuchuncari, which is believed to be an early version of the name Tucumcari.

New York

North Carolina

North Dakota

Counties
 Pembina County – an Ojibwa word for viburnum edule, a plant with red berries which grows in the area. Nineteenth-century journal-writers and observers have translated the word as "summer berry" or "high cranberry".
 City of Pembina
 Sioux County

Settlements

 Anamoose
 Cayuga
 Grano
 Havana
 Lakota
 Makoti
 Mandan
 Michigan City
 Minnewaukan
 Monango
 Neche
 Nekoma
 Niagara
 Oriska
 Tioga
 Wahpeton

Ohio

Counties

 Ashtabula County – from Lenape ashtepihəle, 'always enough (fish) to go around, to be given away'; contraction from apchi 'always' + tepi 'enough' + həle (verb of motion).
 Ashtabula River
 Coshocton County – derived from Unami Lenape Koshaxkink 'where there is a river crossing', probably adapted as Koshaxktun 'ferry' ('river-crossing device').
 Coshocton
 Cuyahoga County – originally Mohawk Cayagaga 'crooked river', possibly related to kayuha 'creek' or kahyonhowanen 'river'.
 Cuyahoga River
 Erie County
 Geauga County – Onondaga jyo’ä·gak, Seneca jo’ä·ka’, 'raccoon' (originally the name of the Grand River). 
 Hocking County
 Licking County
 Mahoning County
 Miami County
 Muskingum County – Shawnee Mshkikwam 'swampy ground' (mshkikwi- 'swamp' + -am 'earth');
 Muskingum River 
 Ottawa County
 Pickaway County
 Sandusky County – from Wyandot saandusti meaning 'water (within water-pools)' or from andusti 'cold water'. 
 City of Sandusky
 Sandusky River
 Scioto County – derived from Wyandot skɛnǫ·tǫ’, 'deer' (compare Shenandoah, also derived from the word for deer in a related Iroquoian language).
 Scioto River
 Seneca County
 Tuscarawas County – after the Iroquoian Tuscarora people, who at one time had a settlement along the river of that name.
 Tuscarawas River
 Wyandot County

Settlements

 Chillicothe – from Shawnee Chala·ka·tha, referring to members of one of the five divisions of the Shawnee people: Chalaka (name of the Shawnee group, of unknown meaning) + -tha 'person'; the present Chillicothe is the most recent of seven places in Ohio that have held that name, because it was applied to the main town wherever the Chalakatha settled as they moved to different places.
 Conneaut – probably derived from Seneca ga-nen-yot, 'standing stone'. 
 Mingo and Mingo Junction – named after the Mingo people, Iroquoians who moved west to Ohio in the 18th century, largely of the Seneca nation. 
 Ohio River – from Seneca Ohiyo 'the best river' or 'the big river'.
 Olentangy – an Algonquian name, probably from Lenape ulam tanchi or Shawnee holom tenshi, both meaning 'red face paint from there'. The Vermilion River likewise was named with a translation of the original Ottawa name Ulam Thipi, 'red face paint river'.
 Piqua – Shawnee Pekowi, name of one of the five divisions of the Shawnee.
 Wapakoneta – from Shawnee Wa·po’kanite 'Place of White Bones' (wa·pa 'white'+(h)o’kani 'bone'+-ite locative suffix).

Oklahoma

Oregon

Counties

 Clackamas Counties, named after the Clackamas tribe.
 Clatsop County, named after the Clatsop people.
 Coos County, named after the Coos people.
 Klamath County, named after the Klamath people.
 Multnomah County named after the Multnomah people.
 Tillamook County, named after the Tillamook people.
 Umatilla County, Sahaptin word, possibly meaning "laughing waters".
 Wallowa County, from the Nez Perce word "wallowa" to designate a tripod of poles used to support fish nets.
 Wasco County, named after the Wasco people.
 Yamhill County, named after the Yamhela people.

Communities

 Alsea/Alsea River, named for the Alsea people
 Clatskanie, a place on the Nehalem River
 Coos Bay
 Depoe Bay, named for a local Indian
 Klamath, multiple places named for the Klamath Tribes
 Multnomah Falls
 Nehalem, multiple places named for the Nehalem people
 Scappoose, means "gravelly plain" in an unknown native language
 Siletz, means crooked river in the language of the Siletz people
 Tualatin, multiple places named for the Tualatin people
 Umatilla, multiple places named for the Umatilla people
 Umpqua, multiple places named for the Umpqua people
 Willamette, multiple places from the Clackamas name for the Columbia River
 Yachats/Yachats River, uncertain origin
 Yamhill, multiple places named for a band of the Kalapuya people

Pennsylvania

Counties

 Allegheny County – probably from Lenape welhik hane
 Allegheny River
 Juniata County – from onoyutta, 'standing stone' in an Iroquoian language, probably Susquehannock. 
 Juniata River
 Lackawanna County – Lenape laxaohane 'fork of a river'
 Lackawanna River
 Lehigh County – anglicisation of the Lenape name for the river, lechewuekink, which means "where there are forks".
 Lycoming County – from Lenape lekawink 'place of sand' or lekawi hane 'sandy stream', from lekaw 'sand'.
 Schuylkill County
 Susquehanna County
 Tioga County – Onondaga, 'At the forks.'
 Venango County – From Lenape 'Onange,' meaning 'a mink.'
 Wyoming County

Settlements

 Aliquippa – Lenape alukwepi 'hat'; after Queen Aliquippa, who was named that because she wore a large hat.
 Analomink – From "tumbling water."
 Catawissa – Lenape, 'growing fat;' a reference to a Delaware Chief in the area, Lapachpeton.
 Conemaugh – Lenape kwənəmuxkw 'otter'. 
 Connoquenessing – Lenape, 'A long way straight' 
 Conshohocken – Lenape kanshihakink 'in elegant land': kanshi 'elegant' + haki 'land' + -nk locative suffix.
 Kingsessing – The name Kingsessing or Chinsessing comes from the Delaware word for "a place where there is a meadow".
 Kiskiminetas – derived from Lenape kishku manitu 'make daylight' (kishku 'day'  + manitu 'make' ), a command to warriors to break camp and go on maneuvers while it is still night (as though it were daylight), according to John Heckewelder. 
 Kittanning – Lenape kithanink 'on the main river': kit 'great, large, big' + hane 'swift river from the mountains' + -ink locative suffix, "the big river" or "the main river" being an epithet for the Allegheny-cum-Ohio, according to John Heckewelder. 
 Loyalhanna – after the name of a Lenape town, Layalhanning, meaning 'at the middle of the river': layel or lawel 'middle' + hane 'river' + -ink locative suffix.
 Loyalsock – Lenape, 'middle creek.' (It is located halfway between lycoming and muncy creeks.)
 Manayunk – Lenape məneyunk 'place of drinking': məne 'drink' + yu 'here' + -nk locative suffix.
 Mauch Chunk – Lenape maxkw-chunk 'bear mountain'. 
 Mehoopany – Lenape, 'where there are wild potatoes." 
 Meshoppen Lenape, 'corals,' or 'beads.' 
 Monongahela – Lenape Mənaonkihəla 'the high riverbanks are washed down; the banks cave in or erode', inanimate plural of mənaonkihəle 'the dirt caves off (such as the bank of a river or creek; or in a landslide)' < mənaonke 'it has a loose bank (where one might fall in)' + -həle (verb of motion).
 Muckinipattis – Lenape for 'deep running water', from mexitkwek 'a deep place full of water' or mexakwixen 'high water, freshet'.  
 Muncy–after the Munsee people < Munsee language mənsiw, 'person from Minisink' (minisink meaning 'at the island': mənəs 'island' + -ink locative suffix) + -iw attributive suffix.
 Nanticoke – From the Nanticoke language, 'Tide water people.' (In reference to themselves)
 Nemacolin – after the 18th-century Lenape chief Nemacolin.
 Nescopeck – Shawnee, 'deep and still water.' 
 Nittany – 'single mountain', from Lenape nekwti 'single' + ahtəne 'mountain'. 
 Ohiopyle – from the Lenape phrase ahi opihəle, 'it turns very white', referring to the frothy waterfalls.
 Passyunk – from Lenape pahsayunk 'in the valley', from pahsaek 'valley' (also the name of Passaic, New Jersey).
 Pennypack–Lenape pənəpekw 'where the water flows downward'. 
 Perkiomen – Lenape, 'where there are cranberries.' 
 Poconos – Lenape pokawaxne 'a creek between two hills'. 
 Punxsutawney – Lenape Punkwsutenay 'town of sandflies or mosquitoes': punkwəs 'sandfly' (<punkw 'dust' + -əs diminutive suffix) + utenay 'town'.
 Pymatuning – Lenape Pimhatunink 'where there are facilities for sweating' < pim- 'to sweat in a sweat lodge'  + hatu 'it is placed' + -n(e) inanimate object marker + -ink locative suffix.
 Queonemysing – Lenape kwənamesink 'place of long fish': kwəni 'long' + names 'fish' + -ink locative suffix.
 Quittapahilla Creek – Lenape kuwe ktəpehəle 'it flows out through the pines': kuwe 'pine tree' + ktəpehəle 'it flows out'.
 Shackamaxon – Lenape sakimaksink 'place of the chiefs': sakima 'chief' + -k plural suffix + -s- (for euphony) -ink locative suffix
 Shamokin – Lenape Shahəmokink 'place of eels', from shoxamekw 'eel'  + -ink locative suffix.
 Shickshinny – Lenape, 'a fine stream.' 
 Sinnemahoning – Lenape ahsəni mahonink 'stony lick', from ahsən 'stone' and mahonink 'at the salt lick'. 
 Susquehanna – Lenape siskuwihane 'muddy river': sisku 'mud' + -wi- (for euphony) + hane 'swift river from the mountains'.
 Tamaqua – Lenape, 'running water;' named for a nearby river.
 Tiadaghton – Seneca, 'pine creek.'
 Tinicum – Lenape mahtanikunk 'Where they catch up with each other'.
 Tulpehocken – Lenape tulpehakink 'in the land of turtles': tulpe 'turtle' + haki 'land' + -nk locative suffix.
 Tionesta – Munsee, 'There it has fine banks.'
 Towamensing – Lenape, 'pasture land,' (literally 'the place of feeding cattle.') 
 Towanda – Nanticoke, 'where we bury the dead.'
 Tunkhannock – Lenape tank hane 'narrow stream', from tank 'small' + hane 'stream'.
 Wapwallopen – Lenape òphalahpink, 'where the white wild hemp grows,' from òp- 'white' + halahpis 'Indian hemp' + -nk locative.
 Wiconisco – Lenape wikin niskew 'A muddy place to live', from wikin 'to live in a place' + niskew 'to be dirty, muddy'. 
 Wissahickon – contraction of Lenape wisamekwhikan 'catfish creek': wisamekw 'catfish' (literally 'fat fish':  <wisam 'fat' + -èkw, bound form of namès 'fish' ) + hikan 'ebb tide, mouth of a creek'. 
 Wyalusing – Lenape, 'the place where the aged man dwells,' a reference to the Moravian missionaries who set up a village in the area. 
 Wyoming Valley – Munsee, xwēwamənk 'at the big river flat': xw- 'big' + ēwam 'river flat' + ənk locative suffix.
 Wysox – Lenape, 'the place of grapes.'
 Youghiogheny – Lenape yuxwiakhane 'stream running a contrary or crooked course', according to John Heckewelder.

Rhode Island

 Apponaug: (Narragansett) "where oysters/shellfish are roasted" or "waiting place"
 Aquidneck Island: (Narragansett) "at the island"
 Canonchet: a 17th-century Narragansett chief
 Chepachet: (Narragansett) "boundary/separation place"
 Conanicut Island: (Narragansett) named for a 17th-century chief Canonicus
 Conimicut: (Narragansett) thought to be named for granddaughter of Canonicus (see above)
 Mount Hope: (from Narragansett Montop or Montaup) "look-out place" or "well-fortified island"
 Narragansett Bay (and town): tribe: "at the narrow point"
 Natick: tribe; "the place I seek" or "home"
 Pascoag (and river): (Nipmuck) "the dividing place" (of river)
 Pawtucket: (Narragansett) "at the falls in the river (tidal stream)"
 Pettaquamscutt Rock (and river): Narragansett) "at the round rock"
 Pontiac: famous mid-18th century Ottawa chief
 Quonochontaug: (Narragansett) "home of the blackfish"
 Sakonnet River (and point): (Narragansett) "home of the black goose"
 Scituate Reservoir: (Wampanoag) "at the cold spring/brook"
 Shawomet: (Narragansett) "at the peninsula/neck" (canoe-landing place)
 Usquepaugh: (Narragansett) "at the end of the pond"
 Weekapaug: (Narragansett) "at the end of the pond"
 Woonsocket: (Nipmuck) "place of steep descent"
 Wyoming: (Delaware) "large prairie"

South Carolina

Counties

 Cherokee County  – named after the Cherokee people.
 Oconee County
 Saluda County
 Saluda River

Settlements
 Seneca

Bodies of water

 Ashepoo River
 Coosawhatchie River
 Lake Jocassee
 Lake Keowee
 Lake Toxaway
 Santee River
 Stono River
 Wando River

Islands
 Edisto Island
 Kiawah Island
 Wadmalaw Island

South Dakota

Counties

 Minnehaha County – from Dakota minnehaha, meaning "waterfall".
 Oglala Lakota County – Lakota for "to scatter one's own".
 Yankton County – corruption of Sioux Ihanktonwan, meaning "the end village".

Settlements

 Canistota – from the New York Native American word canistoe, meaning "board on the water".
 Capa – from the Sioux for "beaver".
 Kadoka – Lakota for "hole in the wall".
 Kampeska – Sioux for "bright and shining", "like a shell or glass".
 Oacoma
 Oglala – Lakota for "to scatter one's own".
 Ottumwa – Algonquian word possibly meaning "rippling waters", "place of perseverance or self-will", or "town".
 Owanka – Lakota for "good camping ground". It was originally named Wicota, a Lakota word meaning "a crowd".
 Pukwana – the name given to the smoke emitted from a Native American peace pipe.
 Ree Heights – named after the Arikara people, sometimes known as the Ree. Arikara may have been a neighboring tribe's word for "horns" or "male deer".
 Seneca – from Algonquian sinnekaas, which referred to the Seneca people.
 Teton – from Dakota tinton or tinta, meaning "prairie".
 Wanblee – from Lakota Waŋblí Hoȟpi, meaning "golden eagle nest".
 Wasta – from Dakota wastah, meaning "good".
 Wakonda – from Sioux wakor or waukon, meaning "wonder, marvel, mystery, sacred".
 Wakpala
 Wecota – from Lakota wicota, meaning "a crowd".
 Wetonka from Dakota wi-tȟáŋka, meaning "big sun".
 Yankton – corruption of Sioux Ihanktonwan, meaning "the end village".

Tennessee

Counties
 Sequatchie County – Cherokee word believed to mean, "opossum, he grins or runs".
 Village of Sequatchie
 Sequatchie River
 Little Sequatchie River
 Sequatchie Valley
 Unicoi County – Native American word for the southern Appalachian Mountains, probably meaning "white" or "fog-draped"
 Town of Unicoi
 Unicoi Range

Settlements

 Atoka
 Bogota
 Bolivar
 Bybee
 Chattanooga – based on cvto, a Muskogean term for 'rock'
 Cherokee
 Cherokee Hills
 Cherokee National Forest
 Chewalla
 Chilhowee Park
 Chilhowee Dam
 Conasauga (McMinn County)
 Conasauga (Polk County)
 Cotula
 Culleoka
 Etowah – Muskogean term for 'town'
 Jalapa
 Lake Tansi Village
 Mohawk
 Montezuma
 Niota
 Ocoee
 Oneida – named after the Oneida people.
 Ooltewah – variation of eh-DOH-wah, Muskogean term for 'town'
 Ottway
 Pocahontas
 Pocahontas (Coffee County)
 Quebeck
 Sango
 Savannah – named for a clan of Shawnee whose native name was Ša·wano·ki (literally, "southerners")
 Sewanee – located on top of the southern end of the Cumberland Plateau, assumed to be a variant of the Algonquian tribal name Shawnee, or a contraction of Haudenosaunee referring to the northern Iroquois or eastern Tuscarora.
 Tallassee
 Tennessee City
 Village of Tennessee Ridge
 Tennessee River
 Little Tennessee River
 Tullahoma – Choctaw for 'red rock' (tali – rock, homma – red)
 Tusculum
 Tusculum Place
 Watauga
 Watauga River
 Yuma

Bodies of water

 Chickamauga Creek
 Chickamauga Lake
 Conasauga River
 Conasauga Creek
 Hatchie River
 Hiwassee River
 Loosahatchie River
 Nolichucky River
 Nonconnah Creek
 Obey River
 Toccoa River
 Tuscumbia River

Texas
Nacogdoches – from Caddo language, Nacogdoche tribe of the Caddo
Quanah – named for the Comanche Chief, Quanah Parker
Waco – from Wichita , the name of a tribal subgroup, the Waco people.

Utah
Juab County – from Paiute word for "flat plain"
Kanab – from Paiute word for willow tree
Kamas – from indigenous word for an edible, wild bulb
Moab – from Paiute "moapa," meaning "mosquitoes", though possibly named after the biblical Moab
Oquirrh Mountains – from Goshute for "glowing, or wooded mountain"
Mount Timpanogos – from Paiute for "rocks and runny water"
Uintah County – from Ute for "pine land"
Utah County, Utah Lake, etc. – "Utah" via "Yudah" or "Yutah" from a language of one of the Ute tribe's neighbors, such as Western Apache yúdah, "high up".
Wasatch (Wasatch Range, Wasatch County, Wasatch Plateau, Wahsatch, etc.) – from "wasatch," a Ute word for "mountain pass" or "low pass over high range"
Various municipal street names including Arapeen Drive ("Arapeen" was a notable 19th-century Paiute), Chipeta Way ("chipeta" is Ute for "rippling water") and Wasatch Boulevard ("wasatch" is Ute for "mountain pass").

Vermont

Settlements

 Mount Ascutney (and village): (Abnaki) "at the end of the river fork"
 Lake Bomoseen (and town): (Abnaki) "keeper of ceremonial fire"
 Jamaica: (Natick) "beaver"
 Passumpsic River (and village): (Abnaki) "flowing over clear, sandy bottom"
 Pompanoosuc: abbreviation of Ompompanoosuc
 Quechee: abbreviation of Ottauquechee
 Winooski River (and city): (Abnaki) "wild onions"

Bodies of Water

 Hoosic River
 Lake Iroquois: (Abnaki-French) "real adders" (describing western enemies of Abnaki)
 Maquam Bay
 Lake Memphremagog: (Abnaki) "where there is great expanse of water"
 Mettawee River
 Missisquoi River: tribal name
 Nulhegan River: (Abnaki) "log trap" or "deadfall"
 Ompompanoosuc River: (Abnaki) "mushy/quaky land"
 Ottauquechee River: (uncertain – Natick?) "swift mountain stream"
 Walloomsac River

Islands
 Popasquash Island
 Queneska Island: (Abnaki) "elbow" or "long joint"

Other

 Hoosac Mountains: (Mahican) "stone place"
 Monadnock Mountain: (Abnaki) "at the mountain which sticks up like an island" (see New Hampshire)
 Moosalamoo Mountain: (Abnaki) "moose trail"
 Netop Mountain: (Natick) "my friend"
 Nickwaket Mountain: (Abnaki) "at the fork" or "home of squirrels"
 Pico Peak: (possibly Abnaki) "the pass/opening"

Virginia

Washington

Alki Beach
Chehalis, Chehalis River
Chelan, Chelan County, Lake Chelan – a Salish language word, Tsi – Laan, meaning "Deep Water"
Chiwawa River
Chinook, Chinook Pass
Cle Elum, Cle Elum River
Copalis Beach, Copalis Crossing
Cowlitz County, Cowlitz River
Dosewallips River
Duckabush River
Duwamish River
Entiat, Entiat River
Hamma Hamma River
Hoh River
Hoquiam
Humptulips, Humptulips River
Hyak
Issaquah
Kachess Lake
Kalaloch
Kitsap Peninsula, Kitsap County – named after Chief Kitsap
Kittitas County, Kittitas
La Push – lapoos or labush is the Chinook Jargon adaptation of the fr. la bouche ("mouth")
Neah Bay
Nespelem
Nisqually River
Nooksack River
Okanogan
Omak
Orondo
Palouse
Pasayten River, Pasayten Wilderness
Puyallup
Pysht River
Sammamish
Seattle – named after Chief Seattle, whose Lushootseed name was Siʔáł
Sequim
Skagit River
Skookumchuck River
Snoqualmie, Snoqualmie Pass, Snoqualmie River
Skykomish River
Snohomish – Lushootseed , the name of a Salishan group (earlier )
Sol Duc River
Spokane – from the Spokane dialect of Interior Salish spoqín
Squaxin Island
Stehekin
Stillaguamish River
Suquamish
Tacoma – from Lushootseed  (earlier ), "snow-covered mountain"
Tillicum
Tonasket
Toppenish
Tulalip Bay
Tumwater – city in Thurston County – "Fast Water / Waterfall"
Twisp, Twisp River
Wapato
Wenatchee, Wenatchee River
Wishkah River
Walla Walla
Yakima

West Virginia

Wisconsin

Wyoming
Cheyenne – From Dakota Šahíyena, the diminutive of Šahíya, "Cree".
The name "Wyoming" comes from a Delaware Tribe word Mechaweami-ing or "maughwauwa-ma", meaning large plains or extensive meadows, which was the tribe's name for a valley in northern Pennsylvania. The name Wyoming was first proposed for use in the American West by Senator Ashley of Ohio in 1865 in a bill to create a temporary government for Wyoming Territory. 
Popo Agie River – From the Absalooke or Crow Language Poppootcháashe, which means "Plopping River" for the sound the water makes when it comes out of the sinkhole in Sinks Canyon, near present Lander, Wyoming.

See also
List of placenames of indigenous origin in the Americas
List of federally recognized tribes by state:  As of May 2013, there were 566 Native American tribes legally recognized by the U.S. Government, according to the article, "List of federally recognized tribes."
Native Americans in the United States

References

Citations

Sources

 
 Bright, William (2004). Native American Placenames of the United States. Norman: University of Oklahoma Press. .
 Campbell, Lyle (1997). American Indian Languages: The Historical Linguistics of Native America. Oxford: Oxford University Press. 
 
 
 O'Brien, Frank Waabu (2010). "Understanding Indian Place Names in Southern New England".  Colorado: Bauu Press.
 
 Vogel, Virgil J. (1986). Indian Names in Michigan. University of Michigan Press. .

 
Native American
Native American-related lists